Subconscious Communications (originally Subconscious Records) is an independent record label based in Toluca Lake, California.  Originating in Vancouver, B.C., Canada, it was founded in 1993 by Dwayne Goettel of Skinny Puppy and Phil Western of Download.  The label has been described as a "record label, musician collective, remix team, 32-track digital studio, [and an] analogue synth museum."

History
Dwayne Goettel and Phil Western founded Subconscious Records in 1993 to release a twelve-inch under Goettel's side project Aduck and Phil's alias Philth.  cEvin Key arbitrarily took over control of Subconscious Communications when Goettel died on 23 August 1995.  Artists previously involved with Goettel and Key joined him to help with the label.

Under the SubCon 'services' page hides two pages listing the competition results of the 2001 and 2002 Cannabis Cup competitions.  The Cannibis Cup was an annual competition that only survived an additional year after its inception in 2001.  Since the name contains SubCon, it is assumed that the competition was formed by Subconscious Communications.

Discography
As of 2009, Subconscious Communications has released 44 albums under the label.  The numbering of the albums however lists the final one (The Dragon Experience) as number 28; this is due to several albums being numbered in pairs, such as 11a and 11b.  Logically this is due to the insignificance of the album (for example the limited edition albums of Skinny Puppy's "back and forth" and Tear Garden's "eye spy with my little eye") or a combination of releases, such as with PlatEAU's "music for grass" and "dutch flowers".

Organized alphabetically by author then chronologically (represented by sub value).

aDuck
Power (sub01)
BananaSLOTH
Zombie Battle 2019 (sub36)
Baseck/Sonic Death Rabbit
Creatures (sub37)
Djoto
Slow Motion Burn (sub38)
Doubting Thomas
Father Don't Cry Re-Issue (sub09)
The Infidel 20 Year Anniversary Re-Issue (sub32)
Download
Furnace (sub02)
Microscopic (sub03)
Charlie's Family (sub05)
Charlie's Family Re-Issue (sub05b)The Eyes of Stanley Pain (sub08)Sidewinder (sub10)III (sub13)Inception (sub14)
III Steps Forward (sub15)
III Steps Forward 2nd pressing (sub15b)
Effector (sub20)
Furnace: REdux (sub30)
Fixer (sub31)
HElicopTEr (sub40)
Hilt
The Worst of the Flu (sub27)
Minoot Bowl Dropped the Ball (sub34)
cEvin Key
Music for Cats (sub16)
The Ghost of Each Room (sub21)
The Dragon Experience (sub28)
PlatEAU
Music For Grass Bars (sub11)
*Dutch Flowers (sub11b)
Spacecake (sub18)
Iceolator (sub24)
Kushbush + Music For Grass Bars (Special Edition) (sub32)
Gort Spacebar (sub41)
Skinny Puppy
Brap: Back and Forth Series 3 & 4 (sub04)
The Process Re-Issue (sub06)
Track 10
Doomsday: Back and Forth, Vol. 5: Live in Dresden (sub22)
Puppy Gristle (sub23)
Puppy Gristle 2nd pressing (sub23b)
Back and Forth Series 6 (sub25)
Back and Forth Series 6 (sub25b)
Back and Forth Series 7 (sub35)
The Tear Garden
To Be An Angel Blind, The Crippled Soul Divide (sub07)
Crystal Mass (sub19)
Eye Spy With My Little Eye (sub26)
Eye Spy With My Little Eye 2nd pressing (sub26b)
Secret Experiment (sub33)
Have A Nice Trip (sub42)
Eye Spy Vol. 2 (sub47)
The Brown Acid Caveat (sub48)
Otto von Schirach
Magic Triangle (sub38)
Subcon Compilations
Paradigm Shift (sub12)
Wild Planet (sub17)
Encore (sub666)
Rare Not For Sale (sub444)

See also
 List of record labels

References

External links
 Official site
 Old site (Archive only)

Skinny Puppy
Record labels established in 1993
American independent record labels
Industrial record labels
Electronic music record labels
Entertainment companies based in California
Companies based in Los Angeles
Toluca Lake, Los Angeles